Makiev or Makiyev is an Ossetian masculine surname, its feminine counterpart is Makieva or Makiyeva.  It may refer to:

  (born 1991), Russian footballer. 
 Valeri Makiyev (born 1985), Russian footballer. 
 Zaur Makiev (born 1992), Russian freestyle wrestler.
  (1950—2016), Soviet and Russian freestyle skiing coach.
 Zurab Makiev (born 1976), Russian politician

Ossetian-language surnames